Bowling at the 2017 ASEAN Para Games was held at Megalanes, Sunway Pyramid, Subang Jaya, Selangor, Malaysia.

Medal tally

Medalists

Men

Women

Mixed

See also
Bowling at the 2017 Southeast Asian Games

External links
 Bowling games results system

2017 ASEAN Para Games
Bowling at the ASEAN Para Games
ASEAN Para Games